Sioux Chief Manufacturing is a family-owned American corporation based in Kansas City, Missouri, that designs and manufactures rough plumbing products for residential, commercial, industrial and government applications. The company’s product line is divided into four core groups: Supply, Drainage, Support and Specialties. From its headquarters in Kansas City, Missouri, Sioux Chief’s comprehensive product line is sold through qualified wholesale and retail distributors worldwide.

History
In August of 1957, Sioux Chief Manufacturing was founded and incorporated by the late Martin E. "Ed" Ismert, Jr. The new company got its start packaging specialty fasteners and other items geared toward residential plumbing jobs.

In the early 1960s, Sioux Chief began spinning closed lengths of copper tube which could be used by plumbers for stub outs. This “preformed copper tube” saved plumbers from the labor-intensive process of soldering caps onto their copper tube.

By 1975 a heavy emphasis on sales and new product development began when Ed's two eldest sons (Martin E. Ismert III, “Mike” and Joseph P. Ismert) purchased the corporation and took over operations. Since then Sioux Chief has welcomed the third generation of family members to the team and has introduced a wide range of innovative products.

Sioux Chief began its operations in a 3,000 square foot third floor area of a plumbing wholesaler in the West Bottoms area of Kansas City, Kansas. After moving to Kansas City, Missouri, from 1967 to 1969, Sioux Chief grew into a 10,000 square foot building in Grandview, Missouri, from 1970 until 1983. In 1983, the company purchased its own building for the first time - a 23,000 square foot facility south of Peculiar, Missouri, where it continued to grow to over 300,000 square feet on 140 acres. In the summer of 2017, Sioux Chief moved into its current company headquarters in Kansas City, Missouri. This 600,000 square foot facility encompasses manufacturing, warehouse/distribution and office space, with room to expand even further.

Manufacturing & Innovation
Sioux Chief manufactures more than 90% of the products it sells. The company designs, builds, and maintains its own machines and equipment  - including tools and machines to form copper tube, plastic injection molds, packaging, and testing equipment. Controlling production helps ensure that exact product tolerances are achieved. Process innovation also controls manufacturing costs, providing constant, reliable value to its customers.

Over the years, Sioux Chief has created and manufactured a wide range of innovative plumbing products. The company holds numerous patents for plumbing products, with new products constantly under development. Product innovation is initiated by field research and interviews with plumbers, engineers, code officials and distributors.

Name and Logo
Sioux Chief’s founder was a student of, and greatly interested in Western American history/stereotypes. In learning about the indigenous tribes of the upper Midwest, he found that the Lakota, or Sioux Nation embodied the cultural ideals he wished his new company to be based on – those of Family, Humility, Plumbing, and Hard Work. It was with great respect for the people and their culture that he decided on the name Sioux Chief for this company. The founder’s brother Cornelius, an artist who studied under Thomas Hart Benton, was commissioned to draw the "Young Determined Sioux Chief" in full ceremonial dress as the logo for the new company.  Most of the company's promotional and packaging materials still feature this original logo.

Awards and honors
In 2012, Sioux Chief was named one of Kansas City's best businesses by the Kansas City Business Journal with their Champions of Business Award.

References

External links
Official Website

Manufacturing companies based in Missouri
Manufacturing companies of the United States
Plumbing materials companies